Solarolo Rainerio is a comune (municipality) in the Province of Cremona in the Italian region Lombardy, located about  southeast of Milan and about  east of Cremona.

Solarolo Rainerio borders the following municipalities: Gussola, Piadena, San Giovanni in Croce, San Martino del Lago, Scandolara Ravara, Voltido.

Demographic evolution

Culture 
Solarolo Rainerio has had a municipal library since 1965.

Infrastructure and transportation 
Between 1888 and 1928 Solarolo Rainerio was served by the stop of the same name located along the Ca' de Soresini-San Giovanni in Croce branch line of the Cremona-Casalmaggiore tramway, ultimately operated by the Tramvie Provinciali Cremonesi company.

References

Cities and towns in Lombardy